The Chiayi-class patrol vessel is a heavy patrol vessel of the Coast Guard Administration of Taiwan. Four ships are planned. All four are planned to be constructed by CSBC Corporation, Taiwan.

Description

The class has a helipad and hangar which can accommodate a UH-60 Black Hawk helicopter. It is equipped with a medical center with a negative pressure area, a surgery suite, and a x-ray facility.

History
The procurement is part of a decade long coast guard shipbuilding project with a projected budget of NT$42.6 billion ($1.4 billion). The budgeted cost of the four 4,000 ton patrol vessels is NT$ 11.74 billion (US$392 million). Delivery of all four is planned to be completed by 2025.

The first vessel of the class, Chiayi (CG5001), was launched in June 2020. The President of Taiwan Tsai Ing-wen presided over the launch. The Coast Guard took possession of Chiayi in April 2021.

The second vessel, Hsinchu (CG5002), was delivered in April 2022.

Vessels 
A total of 4 vessels are planned.

 Chiayi (CG5001), launched in June 2020

 Hsinchu (CG5002), launched in April 2021

 Yunlin (CG5003), launched in December 2022

See also
Anping-class offshore patrol vessel
Cheng Kung-class frigate
Kang Ding-class frigate
Heritage-class cutter
Miaoli-class patrol vessel
Yilan-class patrol vessel

References

Ships built in the Republic of China
Patrol ship classes
Ships of the Coast Guard Administration